Tarlac City held local elections on May 10, 2010, within the Philippine general election. The voters elected candidates for mayor, vice mayor, and ten councilors. The incumbent mayor of Tarlac, Genaro Mendoza, was term-limited and thus unable to seek re-election to another term in office. He unsuccessfully sought election for the 2nd district congressional seat in Tarlac.

Former three-term Mayor Gelacio Manalang, who served from 1992 to 2001, successfully staged a comeback for the mayoralty post after having been defeated by Mendoza during the previous two elections. Manalang narrowly defeated former councilor Sherwin Rigor, as well as Marco Mendoza, brother of incumbent Mayor Mendoza, and incumbent 2nd district provincial board member Amado Go.

In the vice mayoral race, incumbent Vice Mayor Mike Tañedo won reelection to a second term over pediatrician Alejandro Fernandez and incumbent Councilor and former Vice Mayor Jojo Briones.

Mendoza's Team Magsikap coalition won seven out of ten seats in the city council, with Rigor's Team Malasakit coalition getting the remaining three seats.

Candidates
Parties are as stated in their certificate of candidacies.

Team Magsikap

Team Malasakit

Team Balik Sigla

Others

Mayoral and vice mayoral elections
The candidates for mayor and vice mayor with the highest number of votes wins the seat; they are voted separately, therefore, they may be of different parties when elected.

Mayor

Vice Mayor

City Council elections
Tarlac City elected Sangguniang Panlungsod or city council members. A voter votes for up to ten candidates, then the ten candidates with the highest number of votes are elected.  Election is via plurality-at-large voting.

Results per candidate

|-background-color:#efefef"
!width=30|Rank
!style="text-align:left;" width=170|Candidate
!style="text-align:left;" width=160|Coalition
!colspan=2 style="text-align:left;"|Party
!width=30|Votes
!width=30|%
|-style="background: #FFFFCC; font-weight:bold"
|1.|| style="text-align:left;" |Noel Soliman || style="text-align:left;" |Team Magsikap
|  ||  61,998 || 47.94%
|-style="background: #FFFFCC; font-weight:bold"
|2.|| style="text-align:left;" |Arsenio Lugay II || style="text-align:left;" |Team Magsikap
|  || 53,490 || 41.36%
|-style="background: #FFFFCC; font-weight:bold"
|3.|| style="text-align:left;" |Ana Aguas || style="text-align:left;" |Team Magsikap
|    ||52,618 || 40.69%
|-style="background: #FFFFCC; font-weight:bold"
|4.|| style="text-align:left;" |Emily Ladera-Facunla || style="text-align:left;" |Team Malasakit
|  ||50,449 || 39.01%
|-style="background: #FFFFCC; font-weight:bold"
|5.|| style="text-align:left;" |Glenn Troy Caritativo || style="text-align:left;" |Team Magsikap
|    || 49,169 || 38.02%
|-style="background: #FFFFCC; font-weight:bold"
|6.|| style="text-align:left;" |Amado de Leon || style="text-align:left;" |Team Malasakit
|      || 47,468 || 36.70%
|-style="background: #FFFFCC; font-weight:bold"
|7.|| style="text-align:left;" |Richard Diolazo || style="text-align:left;" |Team Magsikap
|    ||  47,271 || 36.55%
|-style="background: #FFFFCC; font-weight:bold"
|8.|| style="text-align:left;" | Joji David || style="text-align:left;" |Team Magsikap
|    || 44,849 || 34.68%
|-style="background: #FFFFCC; font-weight:bold"
|9.|| style="text-align:left;" | Vlad Rodriguez || style="text-align:left;" |Team Magsikap
|        ||  40,478 || 31.30%
|-style="background: #FFFFCC; font-weight:bold"
|10.|| style="text-align:left;" | Weng Quiroz || style="text-align:left;" |Team Malasakit
|       ||  33,994 || 26.29%
|-
|11.|| style="text-align:left;" | Emilio Magbag Jr. || style="text-align:left;" |Team Malasakit
|      ||  32,565 || 25.18%
|-
|12.|| style="text-align:left;" | Pepito Basangan || style="text-align:left;" |Team Magsikap
|    ||  31,319 || 24.22%
|-
|13.|| style="text-align:left;" | Guillermina Tabamo || style="text-align:left;" |Team Balik Sigla
|  ||  31,017 || 23.98%
|-
|14.|| style="text-align:left;" |Andrew Mendoza || style="text-align:left;" |Team Magsikap
|    ||  30,344 || 23.46%
|-
|15.|| style="text-align:left;" | Filoteo Gozum || style="text-align:left;" |Team Balik Sigla
|             ||  28,695 || 22.19%
|-
|16.|| style="text-align:left;" |Cesar Go        || style="text-align:left;" |Team Malasakit
|    ||  26,490 || 20.48%
|-
|17.|| style="text-align:left;" | Romeo Mallari || style="text-align:left;" |Team Malasakit
|            ||  23,294 || 18.01%
|-
|18.|| style="text-align:left;" | Arturo Serrano        || style="text-align:left;" |Team Malasakit
|    ||  23,257 || 17.98%
|-
|19.|| style="text-align:left;" | Ismael Quintos || style="text-align:left;" |Not affiliated
|            ||  22,617 || 17.49%
|-
|20.|| style="text-align:left;" |Roy Escalona   || style="text-align:left;" |Team Malasakit
|            ||  21,428 || 16.57%
|-
|21.|| style="text-align:left;" |Ernesto Galang || style="text-align:left;" | Team Malasakit
|            ||  20,288 || 15.69%
|-
|22.|| style="text-align:left;" |Erlinda Dueñas || style="text-align:left;" |Team Magsikap
|    || 19,735 || 15.26%
|-
|23.|| style="text-align:left;" |Freddy Quiroz          || style="text-align:left;" |Team Balik Sigla
|    ||  19,711 || 15.24%
|-
|24.|| style="text-align:left;" |Odessa Bautista|| style="text-align:left;" |Team Balik Sigla
|     ||  19,628 || 15.18%
|-
|25.|| style="text-align:left;" |Rosalie Mallari || style="text-align:left;" | Team Balik Sigla
|   ||  16,982 || 13.13%
|-
|26.|| style="text-align:left;" |Noel Manalili|| style="text-align:left;" | Team Malasakit
|    ||  14,436 || 11.16%
|-
|27.|| style="text-align:left;" |Nestor David|| style="text-align:left;" | Not affiliated
|    || 12,744 || 9.85%
|-
|28.|| style="text-align:left;" |Paul Villafaña|| style="text-align:left;" | Team Balik Sigla
|  ||  10,379 || 8.03%
|-
|29.|| style="text-align:left;" |Willie Tiamzon|| style="text-align:left;" | Team Balik Sigla
|  ||7,584 || 5.86%
|-
|30.|| style="text-align:left;" |Cesar Rivera || style="text-align:left;" | Team Balik Sigla
|  ||6,135|| 4.74%
|-
|31.|| style="text-align:left;" |Manuel Dimatulac Sr. || style="text-align:left;" | Not affiliated
|  ||5,159|| 3.99%
|-
|32.|| style="text-align:left;" |Marcus de Jesus || style="text-align:left;" | Not affiliated
|  ||4,795|| 3.71%
|-
|33.|| style="text-align:left;" |Macario Bustos || style="text-align:left;" | Not affiliated
|  ||3,669|| 2.84%
|-
|34.|| style="text-align:left;" |Galicano Datu Jr. || style="text-align:left;" | Not affiliated
|  ||2,128|| 1.65%
|-
|-style="background-color:#E9E9E9; font-weight:bold"
|colspan=5|Total turnout || 129,325 || 
|-
! style="background-color:#AAAAAA;text-align:left;" colspan=3 | Note: A total of 34 candidates ran for councilor.
!style="background-color:#AAAAAA" colspan=4|Source: COMELEC transparency server
|}

Results per coalition

Results per party

Notes:
 Amado Go ran as mayor under the NPC. However, all NPC city council candidates are under Rigor's Sama-Sama Tarlac / Team Malasakit slate.

References

External links
 COMELEC - Official website of the Philippine Commission on Elections (COMELEC)
 NAMFREL - Official website of National Movement for Free Elections (NAMFREL)
 PPCRV - Official website of the Parish Pastoral Council for Responsible Voting (PPCRV)

 
2010 Philippine local elections
Tarlac City